Chasm is the first album by the industrial band Delta-S, originally released in March 2005 as Chasm, Volume 0 on WindM Records. It was later re-released as Chasm, Volume 1 in May that same year.

Track listing
"Catacombs" – 3:57
"Avenge Me, I'm Decaying" – 6:48
"Agitator" – 3:46
"Anti-Hero_" – 4:07
"The Spoil Plantation" – 2:49
"Deceived" – 5:48
"Daywalker" – 2:51
"Bad Kitty" – 4:27
"Vixxxen" – 3:51
"Toxica" – 5:03
"Tragedy at Carnival Hall" – 3:48
"Rage Into Blindness" (featuring Pamela Vain) – 5:23
"All You" – 6:04
"A Fading Fragrance" – 3:34

2005 albums
Delta-S albums